Claude Mossé (24 December 1924 – 12 December 2022) was a French historian specializing in the history of Ancient Greece.

Biography 
Mossé was born in Paris on 24 December 1924, as the daughter of a wine merchant. She was the sister of Eliane Mossé, researcher in macroeconomics, and Arlette Mosse, clinical nutritionist. In the winter of 1941, during World War II and aged 16, she first read a text on liberty and democracy by Demosthenes; since then, she dedicated her life to Greek history, never having married or having any children.

Her favourite historical subject was 4th century BCE Athens. Mossé belonged to the same school of historical thought with Jean-Pierre Vernant and Pierre Vidal-Naquet. She was professor emeritus at the University of Paris VIII. Her works have been translated into many languages including English, German, Spanish, Italian, Portuguese and modern Greek.

Mossé died in Draveil, Essonne on 12 December 2022, at the age of 97.

Selected works 
 La Fin de la démocratie athénienne. Aspects sociaux et politiques du déclin de la cité grecque au ive siècle av. J.-C., Paris, 1962
 Le Travail en Grèce et à Rome, Paris, PUF, Que sais-je?, 1966
 Les Institutions grecques, Paris, Armand Colin, 1968
 La Tyrannie dans la Grèce antique, Paris, PUF, 1969
 La Colonisation dans l'Antiquité, Paris, Nathan, 1970
 Histoire d'une démocratie, Athènes, Paris, Le Seuil, 1971
 Histoire des doctrines politiques en Grèce, Paris, PUF, Que sais-je?, 1975
 La Femme dans la Grèce antique, Paris, Albin Michel, 1983
 La Grèce archaïque d'Homère à Eschyle, Paris, Le Seuil, 1984
 Le Procès de Socrate, Bruxelles, Complexe, 1987
 L'Antiquité dans la Révolution française, Paris, Albin Michel, 1989
 Précis d'histoire grecque. Du début du deuxième millénaire à la bataille d'Actium, with Annie Schnapp-Gourbeillon, Paris, Armand Colin, 1990
 Les Mythes Grecs, Photographs by Erich Lessing, Nathan, 1991
 Dictionnaire de la civilisation grecque, Bruxelles, Complexe, 1992
 Le Citoyen dans la Grèce antique, Paris, Nathan, 1993
 Démosthène ou les ambiguïtés de la politique, Paris, Armand Colin, 1994
 Politique et société en Grèce ancienne. Le « modèle » athénien, Paris, Aubier, 1995
 Meurtres sur l'Agora, Calmann-Lévy, 1995
 Alexandre. La destinée d'un mythe, Paris, Payot, 2001
 Périclès, l'inventeur de la démocratie, Payot, coll. biography, 2005
 Les Grecs inventent la politique, Complexe, 2005
 Sacrilèges et trahisons à Athènes, Larousse, 2009
 Au nom de la loi. Justice et politique à Athènes à l'âge classique, Payot, 2010
 Regards sur la démocratie athénienne, Perrin, 2013

See also 
 Classics

References 

1924 births
2022 deaths
20th-century French historians
20th-century French women writers
Scholars of ancient Greek history
French hellenists
Writers of historical fiction set in antiquity
Academic staff of the University of Paris
French women historians
Writers from Paris